The harmonic mean p-value (HMP) is a statistical technique for addressing the multiple comparisons problem that controls the strong-sense family-wise error rate (this claim has been disputed). It improves on the power of Bonferroni correction by performing combined tests, i.e. by testing whether groups of p-values are statistically significant, like Fisher's method. However, it avoids the restrictive assumption that the p-values are independent, unlike Fisher's method. Consequently, it controls the false positive rate when tests are dependent, at the expense of less power (i.e. a higher false negative rate) when tests are independent. Besides providing an alternative to approaches such as Bonferroni correction that controls the stringent family-wise error rate, it also provides an alternative to the widely-used Benjamini-Hochberg procedure (BH) for controlling the less-stringent false discovery rate. This is because the power of the HMP to detect significant groups of hypotheses is greater than the power of BH to detect significant individual hypotheses.

There are two versions of the technique: (i) direct interpretation of the HMP as an approximate p-value and (ii) a procedure for transforming the HMP into an asymptotically exact p-value. The approach provides a multilevel test procedure in which the smallest groups of p-values that are statistically significant may be sought.

Direct interpretation of the harmonic mean p-value 
The weighted harmonic mean of p-values  is defined as  where  are weights that must sum to one, i.e. . Equal weights may be chosen, in which case .

In general, interpreting the HMP directly as a p-value is anti-conservative, meaning that the false positive rate is higher than expected. However, as the HMP becomes smaller, under certain assumptions, the discrepancy decreases, so that direct interpretation of significance achieves a false positive rate close to that implied for sufficiently small values (e.g. ).

However, these bounds represent worst case scenarios under arbitrary dependence that are likely to be conservative in practice. Rather than applying these bounds, asymptotically exact p-values can be produced by transforming the HMP.

Asymptotically exact harmonic mean p-value procedure 
Generalized central limit theorem shows that an asymptotically exact p-value, can be computed from the HMP, using the formula Subject to the assumptions of generalized central limit theorem, this transformed p-value becomes exact as the number of tests, becomes large. The computation uses the Landau distribution, whose density function can be writtenThe test is implemented by the p.hmp command of the harmonicmeanp R package; a tutorial is available online.

Equivalently, one can compare the HMP to a table of critical values (Table 1). The table illustrates that the smaller the false positive rate, and the smaller the number of tests, the closer the critical value is to the false positive rate.

Multiple testing via the multilevel test procedure 
If the HMP is significant at some level  for a group of  p-values, one may search all subsets of the  p-values for the smallest significant group, while maintaining the strong-sense family-wise error rate. Formally, this constitutes a closed-testing procedure.

When  is small (e.g. ), the following multilevel test based on direct interpretation of the HMP controls the strong-sense family-wise error rate at level approximately 

 Define the HMP of any subset  of the   p-values to be 
 Reject the null hypothesis that none of the p-values in subset  are significant if , where . (Recall that, by definition, .)

An asymptotically exact version of the above replaces in step 2 with  where  gives the number of p-values, not just those in subset .

Since direct interpretation of the HMP is faster, a two-pass procedure may be used to identify subsets of p-values that are likely to be significant using direct interpretation, subject to confirmation using the asymptotically exact formula.

Properties of the HMP 
The HMP has a range of properties that arise from generalized central limit theorem. It is:

 Robust to positive dependency between the p-values. 
 Insensitive to the exact number of tests, L. 
 Robust to the distribution of weights, w. 
 Most influenced by the smallest p-values.

When the HMP is not significant, neither is any subset of the constituent tests. Conversely, when the multilevel test deems a subset of p-values to be significant, the HMP for all the p-values combined is likely to be significant; this is certain when the HMP is interpreted directly. When the goal is to assess the significance of individual p-values, so that combined tests concerning groups of p-values are of no interest, the HMP is equivalent to the Bonferroni procedure but subject to the more stringent significance threshold  (Table 1).

The HMP assumes the individual p-values have (not necessarily independent) standard uniform distributions when their null hypotheses are true. Large numbers of underpowered tests can therefore harm the power of the HMP.

While the choice of weights is unimportant for the validity of the HMP under the null hypothesis, the weights influence the power of the procedure.

Bayesian interpretations of the HMP 
The HMP was conceived by analogy to Bayesian model averaging and can be interpreted as inversely proportional to a model-averaged Bayes factor when combining p-values from likelihood ratio tests.

The harmonic mean rule-of-thumb 
I. J. Good reported an empirical relationship between the Bayes factor and the p-value from a likelihood ratio test. For a null hypothesis  nested in a more general alternative hypothesis  he observed that often, where  denotes the Bayes factor in favour of  versus  Extrapolating, he proposed a rule of thumb in which the HMP is taken to be inversely proportional to the model-averaged Bayes factor for a collection of  tests with common null hypothesis:For Good, his rule-of-thumb supported an interchangeability between Bayesian and classical approaches to hypothesis testing.

Bayesian calibration of p-values 
If the distributions of the p-values under the alternative hypotheses follow Beta distributions with parameters , a form considered by Sellke, Bayarri and Berger, then the inverse proportionality between the model-averaged Bayes factor and the HMP can be formalized as where

 is the prior probability of alternative hypothesis  such that 
 is the expected value of  under alternative hypothesis 
 is the weight attributed to p-value 
 incorporates the prior model probabilities and powers into the weights, and
 normalizes the weights.

The approximation works best for well-powered tests.

The harmonic mean p-value as a bound on the Bayes factor 

Under the assumption that the distributions of the p-values under the alternative hypotheses follow Beta distributions with parameters  and that the weights  the HMP provides a tighter upper bound on the model-averaged Bayes factor:a result that again reproduces the inverse proportionality of Good's empirical relationship.

References 

Multiple comparisons
Statistical hypothesis testing